Fakiha (also Fakeha or Fekeheh) is a village in the  Baalbek District, in Baalbek-Hermel Governorate, Lebanon.

References

Populated places in Baalbek District
Melkite Christian communities in Lebanon
Sunni Muslim communities in Lebanon